Peperomia venulosa is a species of epiphyte from the genus Peperomia. It grows in wet tropical biomes. It was first described by Truman G. Yuncker in 1957.

Etymology
Venulosa came from the word "venule". Venule is a small vein that connects capillaries to a larger vein.

Subtaxa
Two varieties are recognized:

Peperomia venulosa var. avenulosa 
Peperomia venulosa var. venulosa

Distribution
Peperomia venulosa is native to Peru, Colombia, and Ecuador. In Colombia, specimens are collected at an elevation of 780–1900 meters. Specimens in Peru and Ecuador can be found at an elevation of 800-2015 meters.

References

venulosa
Flora of Peru
Flora of Colombia
Flora of Ecuador
Plants described in 1957
Taxa named by Truman G. Yuncker